Åvik is a small seaport village in Lindesnes municipality in Agder county, Norway. There are many old wooden houses in Åvik.

Media gallery

References

External links
Ulka Charter

Villages in Agder
Lindesnes